The Ricoh XR-P is a 35mm Single Lens Reflex (SLR) camera introduced in 1984.

Specifications 

The XR-P's lens system is the Ricoh System RK mount.  Shutter speed ranges from 16 seconds to 1/2000 seconds plus B and TV.  It has a self-timer of 10 seconds (zero seconds for left-hand shutter operation), and an interval timer of 2 seconds, 15 seconds, or 60 seconds.  The viewfinder's field of view covers 93%, magnification at .88X with 50mm, F1.4 standard lens.  Viewfinder display includes Exposure adjustment, AE lock, manual, program mode, TV mode, overexposure and under exposure marks, shutter speed indicator, battery low warning, and programmed F-stop.

References 
Ricoh XR-P Multi-Program users manual, Ricoh Company, Ltd., Tokyo
Ricoh XR-P The "Long Course", Ricoh Corporation, West Caldwell, NJ

SLR cameras